Chrysiptera is a genus of damselfish in the family Pomacentridae.

Species
 
 
There are currently 38 recognized species in this genus:
 Chrysiptera albata G. R. Allen & S. Bailey, 2002
 Chrysiptera annulatus (W. K. H. Peters, 1855) (Footballer damselfish) 
 Chrysiptera arnazae G. R. Allen, Erdmann & P. H. Barber, 2010 (Arnaz's damselfish)
 Chrysiptera biocellata (Quoy & Gaimard, 1825) (Twin-spot damselfish) 
 Chrysiptera bleekeri (Fowler & Bean, 1928) (Bleeker's damselfish)
 Chrysiptera brownriggii (E. T. Bennett, 1828) (Surge damselfish)
 Chrysiptera burtjonesi Allen, Erdmann & Cahyani, 2017 (Burt's damselfish)  
 Chrysiptera caeruleolineata (G. R. Allen, 1973) (Blue-line damselfish)
 Chrysiptera caesifrons G. R. Allen, Erdmann & Kurniasih, 2015 (Grey-back damselfish) 
 Chrysiptera chrysocephala Manica, N. J. Pilcher & S. G. Oakley, 2002	
 Chrysiptera cyanea (Quoy & Gaimard, 1825) (Sapphire damselfish)
 Chrysiptera cymatilis G. R. Allen, 1999 (Malenesian damselfish)
 Chrysiptera ellenae G. R. Allen, Erdmann & Cahyani, 2015 (Ellen's damselfish) 
 Chrysiptera flavipinnis (G. R. Allen & D. R. Robertson, 1974) (Yellow-fin damselfish)
 Chrysiptera galba (G. R. Allen & J. E. Randall, 1974) (Canary damselfish) 
 Chrysiptera giti G. R. Allen & Erdmann, 2008 (Giti damselfish) 
 Chrysiptera glauca (G. Cuvier, 1830) (Grey damselfish)
 Chrysiptera hemicyanea (M. C. W. Weber, 1913) (Azure damselfish)
 Chrysiptera kuiteri G. R. Allen & Rajasuriya, 1995 (Kuiter's damselfish)
 Chrysiptera leucopoma (G. Cuvier, 1830) 
 Chrysiptera maurineae G. R. Allen, Erdmann & Cahyani, 2015 (Maurine's damselfish)  
 Chrysiptera niger (G. R. Allen, 1975) (Black damselfish)
 Chrysiptera notialis (G. R. Allen, 1975) (Southern damselfish)
 Chrysiptera oxycephala (Bleeker, 1877) (Blue-spot damselfish)
 Chrysiptera papuensis G. R. Allen, Erdmann & Cahyani, 2015 (Papuan damselfish)  
 Chrysiptera parasema (Fowler, 1918) (Gold-tail damselfish)
 Chrysiptera pricei G. R. Allen & Adrim, 1992 (Price's damselfish)
 Chrysiptera rapanui (D. W. Greenfield & Hensley, 1970) (Easter damselfish)
 Chrysiptera rex (Snyder, 1909) (King damselfish)
 Chrysiptera rollandi (Whitley, 1961) (Rolland's damselfish)
 Chrysiptera sinclairi G. R. Allen, 1987 (Sinclair's damselfish)
 Chrysiptera springeri (G. R. Allen & Lubbock, 1976) (Springer's damselfish)
 Chrysiptera starcki (G. R. Allen, 1973) (Starck's damselfish)
 Chrysiptera talboti (G. R. Allen, 1975) (Talbot's damselfish)
 Chrysiptera taupou (D. S. Jordan & Seale, 1906) (South-seas damselfish)
 Chrysiptera traceyi (L. P. Woods &  L. P. Schultz, 1960) (Tracey's damselfish) 
 Chrysiptera tricincta (G. R. Allen & J. E. Randall, 1974) (Three-band damselfish)
 Chrysiptera unimaculata (G. Cuvier, 1830) (One-spot damselfish)

References

 
Pomacentrinae
Marine fish genera
Taxa named by William John Swainson